Koakin may refer to:

Koakin, Kombissiri, Burkina Faso
Koakin, Saponé, Burkina Faso